Rakvere Spordihall is a multi-purpose arena in Rakvere, Estonia. It was built in 2004 and holds up to 2,422 people during sports events and up to 3,556 during concerts. When opened, it was the second largest sports arena in Estonia.

It generally hosts basketball games, as well as volleyball and concerts.

The attendance record for the sports events was in the 2009/10 season, when 2,900 people gathered to watch third Korvpalli Meistriliiga final game against Tartu Rock.

References

External links
 

Rakvere
Sport in Rakvere
Sports venues completed in 2004
Sports venues in Estonia
Indoor arenas in Estonia
Buildings and structures in Lääne-Viru County
Tourist attractions in Lääne-Viru County
Basketball venues in Estonia
Volleyball venues in Estonia
2004 establishments in Estonia